The following is a list of squads for each national team which competed at the 2020 Africa Futsal Cup of Nations. The tournament took place in Morocco, between 28 January–7 February 2020. It was the sixth competition organised by the Confederation of African Football.

The eight national teams involved in the tournament were required to register a squad of maximum 14 players, minimum two of whom must be goalkeepers. Only players in these squads were eligible to take part in the tournament. CAF published the final lists with squad numbers on their website on 25 January 2020.

The full squad listings are below. The age listed for each player is on 28 January 2020, the first day of the tournament. The nationality for each club reflects the national association (not the league) to which the club is affiliated. A flag is included for coaches who are of a different nationality than their own national team.

Group A

Morocco 
Coach: Hicham Dguig

The final squad was announced on 18 January 2020.

Libya 
Coach:  Julio Fernández

The preliminary squad was announced on 11 December 2019.

Equatorial Guinea 
Coach:  Ricardo Íñiguez

Mauritius 
Coach:  Théo Timboussaint

The final squad was announced on 22 January 2020.

Group B

Egypt 
Coach: Hesham Saleh

The final squad was announced on 23 January 2020.

Guinea 
Coach: Mohamed Camara

Angola 
Coach: Benvindo Inácio

The preliminary squad was announced on 22 January 2020.

Mozambique 
Coach: Naymo Abdul

The final squad was announced on 12 January 2020.

References

Squads
Africa Futsal Cup of Nations squads